A total solar eclipse occurred on September 22, 1968. A solar eclipse occurs when the Moon passes between Earth and the Sun, thereby totally or partly obscuring the image of the Sun for a viewer on Earth. A total solar eclipse occurs when the Moon's apparent diameter is larger than the Sun's, blocking all direct sunlight, turning day into darkness. Totality occurs in a narrow path across Earth's surface, with the partial solar eclipse visible over a surrounding region thousands of kilometres wide. Totality was visible from the Soviet Union (today's Russia and Kazakhstan) and Xinjiang in Northwestern China.

Observation

Soviet Union 
A company named Opton proposed to the Sternberg Astronomical Institute to observe this solar eclipse in Sary Shagan on the west bank of Lake Balkhash, and also wrote to the Soviet Ministry of Railways for help to get to the destination faster. The observation team obtained spectrum of the corona. Students also assisted in taking pictures of the corona with MTO-1000 lens. Due to the change of temperature, snakes also appeared during the observation.

China 
This is the first total solar eclipse visible in the country since the founding of the People's Republic of China. It occurred during the Cultural Revolution, when astronomers including Zhang Yuzhe who organized observations of the total solar eclipse of June 19, 1936 and September 21, 1941 were excluded from key positions. The Chinese Academy of Sciences sent a team of 200 including Zhang Kuisan (张魁三), the then deputy director of the Geophysics Bureau to Xinjiang. The observation was code-named "532", named after the time February 1953 when Mao Zedong visited the Purple Mountain Observatory in Nanjing. The travel to Ürümqi by train first took 3 days, and another 7 days by car to the optical observation site Zhaosu Town (Mongolküre Town), Zhaosu County and the radio observation site Kashgar. Gravity measurements were also conducted in mountain caves. In order to avoid the turmoil of the Cultural Revolution, Zhou Enlai sent Liu Xiyao to lead the army to the local area and provide the whole team with meals and accommodation. The observation team completed the first monochromatic light observation and high-resolution radio observation of the sun in China. This was also the first time in China that a solar eclipse was observed by plane. Shanghai Scientific and Educational Film Studio also produced a science and education film of the total solar eclipse.

The Soviet Union and China were the only two countries the path of this total solar eclipse passed. Due to the Sino-Soviet split, the two countries did not conduct any joint observations. About half a year after the eclipse, on January 23, 1969, the People's Daily published an article claiming that the observation of this eclipse "achieved brilliant results", repeatedly criticized the Soviet Union of "obstructing" it, and also mentioned that the Soviet Union "plundered data" of the annular solar eclipse of April 19, 1958.

Related eclipses

Solar eclipses of 1968–1971

Saros 124

Tritos series

References

External links

 Photos from solar eclipse of September 22, 1968 in USSR (Russian)

1968 09 22
1968 in science
1968 09 22
September 1968 events